The Ipswich General Cemetery is a historic cemetery in Ipswich, Queensland, Australia. It is the second oldest cemetery in Queensland.

It is owned by Ipswich City Council, but the council have outsourced the day-to-day operations to a private contractor Norwood Park Limited, trading as Ipswich Cemeteries.

Geography

The cemetery is bounded by Warwick Road, Cooney Street, Parrott Street, Briggs Road and Cemetery Road. It is a denominational cemetery with sections allocated to Roman Catholic Church, Church of England, Methodist Church, Presbyterian Church, Congregational Church, Baptist Church, Lutheran Church, Christadelphian Church and Salvation Army. In addition, there are areas for pioneer graves and war graves.

The Australian forces war graves (comprising 64 army and 24 air force personnel) are on a triangular plot, dominated by a Cross of Sacrifice.  Here are buried 12 personnel from World War I and 88 from World War II.

History
The first recorded burial in the cemetery was four-year-old John Carr on 20 July 1868. However, recent investigations using metal detectors have located a number of undocumented graves in the pioneer section of the cemetery which may date back to the 1840s.

Current use
The cemetery is closed to new burials, but burials can take place in existing family graves. Cremated remains can be placed in the columbarium wall or placed in family graves.

Notable people buried
 The Babies of Walloon (Bridget Kate and Mary Jane Broderick)

See also
 Burials at Ipswich General Cemetery

Gallery

References

External links

 
 Monumental inscriptions and photos

Cemeteries in Queensland
Ipswich, Queensland
Burials at Ipswich General Cemetery